Credo is a 1997 Danish thriller film. Its original Danish title is Sekten, which means "The Sect". Written and directed by Susanne Bier, the film stars Sofie Gråbøl and Ellen Hillingsø, and was produced by Zentropa.

Cast
Sofie Gråbøl ... Mona
Ellen Hillingsø ... Anne
Sverre Anker Ousdal ... Dr. Lack
Stina Ekblad ... Karen
Ghita Nørby ... Mother-in-law
Christina Ankerskjold ... Freja
Camilla Søeberg ... Bolette
Ulrich Thomsen ... Svane
Jesper Langberg ... Dr. Frederiksen
Jesper Christensen ... Brother 1
 ... Brother 2
 ... Fortune Teller
Solbjørg Højfeldt ... Psychologist
Philip Zandén ... Inspector
 ... Wedding Planner

External links

References

Danish thriller films
1990s thriller films
Films directed by Susanne Bier
Films scored by Hilmar Örn Hilmarsson
Zentropa films
Films produced by Peter Aalbæk Jensen